Anne Dupire (born 1902, date of death unknown) was a French freestyle swimmer. She competed in two events at the 1928 Summer Olympics.

References

External links
 

1902 births
Year of death unknown
French female freestyle swimmers
Olympic swimmers of France
Swimmers at the 1928 Summer Olympics
Place of birth missing